The Revolutionary Coordinating Junta or JCR (Junta Coordinadora Revolucionaria) was an alliance of leftist South American guerrilla organizations in the mid-1970s. The JCR was composed of the Chilean Revolutionary Left Movement (MIR), the Argentine People's Revolutionary Army (ERP), the Uruguayan Tupamaros, and the Bolivian National Liberation Army (ELN). 

The alliance was targeted by Pinochet's Operation Condor in 1975. In 1976, JCR established a counterintelligence unit run by the MIR and based in Stockholm, to monitor Operation Condor activities in Northern Europe.  The JCR alliance was supported and organized by the government of Cuba, which also provided training, weapons, and shelter to the guerrillas.

Member organizations

References

External links
Chilean Movement of the Revolutionary Left-MIR (Official Site)
Tupamaros (Official Site)
John Dinges (Official Site)
Cold War organizations
Cold War in Latin America
Communist parties in South America
Defunct communist militant groups
Guerrilla movements in Latin America